Her Greatest Performance is a 1916 British silent crime film directed by Fred Paul and starring Edith Craig, Ellen Terry and Dennis Neilson-Terry.

Gerald Lovelace (Dennis Neilson-Terry) is accused of a crime and wrongly arrested, his mother (Ellen Terry) gives 'her greatest performance' when providing him with an alibi. Joan Morgan plays his daughter.

Presumably this is a lost film.

Main cast
 Edith Craig - The Dresser
 Ellen Terry - Julia Lovelace
 Dennis Neilson-Terry - Gerald Lovelace
 Joan Morgan - Barbara Lovelace
 James Lindsay - Jim Douglas
 Gladys Mason - Mary Scott

References

External links
 

1916 films
British crime films
British silent feature films
Films directed by Fred Paul
1916 crime films
Ideal Film Company films
British black-and-white films
1910s English-language films
1910s British films